USENIX is an American 501(c)(3) nonprofit membership organization based in Berkeley, California and founded in 1975 that supports advanced computing systems and operating system (OS) research. Its stated mission is to foster technical excellence and innovation, support and disseminate research with a practical bias, provide a neutral forum for discussion of technical issues, and encourage computing outreach into the community at large.

History 
USENIX was established in 1975 under the name "Unix Users Group," focusing primarily on the study and development of the Unix OS family and similar systems. In June 1977, a lawyer from AT&T Corporation informed the group that they could not use the word "Unix" in their name as it was a trademark of Western Electric (the manufacturing arm of AT&T until 1995), which led to the change of name to USENIX. It has since grown into a respected organization among practitioners, developers, and researchers of computer operating systems more generally. Since its founding, it has published a technical journal titled ;login:.

USENIX was started as a technical organization. As commercial interest grew, a number of separate groups started in parallel, most notably the Software Tools Users Group (STUG), a technical adjunct for Unix-like tools and interface on non-Unix operating systems, and /usr/group, a commercially oriented user group.

USENIX's founding President was Lou Katz.

Conferences
USENIX hosts numerous conferences and symposia each year, including:

USENIX Symposium on Operating Systems Design and Implementation (OSDI) (was bi-annual till 2020)
USENIX Security Symposium (USENIX Security)
USENIX Conference on File and Storage Technologies (FAST)
USENIX Symposium on Networked Systems Design and Implementation (NSDI)
USENIX Annual Technical Conference (USENIX ATC)
SREcon, a conference for engineers focused on site reliability, systems engineering, and working with complex distributed systems at scale
LISA, the Large Installation System Administration Conference
Enigma, a conference focused on practical privacy and security expertise and knowledge sharing in a welcoming and inclusive environment

Publications 
USENIX publishes a magazine called ;login: that appears four times a year. From 2021, it has become an all-digital magazine and openly accessible. ;login: content informs the community about practically relevant research, useful tools, and relevant events.

From 1988-1996, USENIX published the quarterly journal Computing Systems, about the theory and implementation of advanced computing systems in the UNIX tradition. It was published first by the University of California Press, then by the MIT Press. The issues have been scanned and are online.

Open access 
USENIX became the first computing association to provide open access to their conference and workshop papers in 2008. Since 2011, they have provided audio and video recordings of paper presentations and conference talks in their open-access materials, free of charge.

USENIX Lifetime Achievement Award

This award, also called the "Flame" award, has been presented since 1993.

2020 Chet Ramey
2019 Margo Seltzer
2018 Eddie Kohler
2014 Thomas E. Anderson
2012 John Mashey
2011 Dan Geer
2010 Ward Cunningham
2009 Gerald J. Popek
2008 Andrew S. Tanenbaum
2007 Peter Honeyman
2006 Radia Perlman
2005 Michael Stonebraker
2004 M. Douglas McIlroy
2003 Rick Adams
2002 James Gosling
2001 The GNU Project and all its contributors
2000 W. Richard Stevens
1999 "The X Window System Community at Large"
1998 Tim Berners-Lee
1997 Brian W. Kernighan
1996 The Software Tools Users Group (Dennis E. Hall, Deborah Scherrer, Joe Sventek)
1995 The Creation of USENET by Jim Ellis, Steven M. Bellovin, and Tom Truscott
1994 Networking Technologies
1993 Berkeley UNIX

See also
AUUG
LISA (conference)
Marshall Kirk McKusick
LISA SIG: Formerly SAGE (organization)
Unix

References

External links

USENIX: The Advanced Computing Systems Association
Official USENIX YouTube Channel

Unix
System administration
Lifetime achievement awards